Aadim Vichar (English: The Ancient Justice) is a 2014 Indian Sambalpuri language drama film directed by Sabyasachi Mohapatra. The film won 62nd National Film Award for Best Feature Film in Odia and is a sequel to the 2012 movie "Sala Budha". Atal Bihari Panda and Sushree Smita Panda played lead roles in the film.

Plot
Sukru Majhi (Atal Bihari Panda), an 84-year-old Kondh tribal and always a righteous humanist and loving person. He has three sons living with their wives and two grandchildren in a village. Majhi lives a very happy life until an Ayurvedic Practitioner (Vaidya) comes to the village. The Vaidya is a tout and keeps a greedy eye on the lands of the locals.

The Vaidya traps the locals into conspiracy and drags them into litigation, and in return, he captures their land. Somehow he provokes Sukru's eldest son to go against his father and convinces him to file a case against his father for his property. But Sukru smartly makes a statement in front of the judge which surprises the judge and everyone present in the court. He decides to stay with his eldest son (adopted) and requests to give his property to his legitimate sons, the case gets solved in a happy ending.

Cast
Atal Bihari Panda as Sukru Majhi
Tapaswini Guru
Puroshottam Mishra
Lochani Bag as Sukru Majhi's Daughter in Law
Sushree Smita Panda
Shankar Behera
Munia Panigrahi

Soundtrack
The movie's songs were Composed by Ghasiram Mishra and Pankaj Jal. "Likri Jhikri" and "Lal Jhara Jhara" both sang by Sarbeswar Bhoi, were declared Hits all over odisha.

Reception

Critical response
The film got rave reviews from critics upon release.

Awards and nominations

Notes

References

External links 
 

Indian cinema articles by quality
2010s Odia-language films
2014 films
Films directed by Sabyasachi Mohapatra